Igor Valeryevich Golban (born July 31, 1990) is a professional footballer who plays as a defender for Navbahor Namangan in the Uzbekistan Super League. Born in Russia during the Soviet period, he represents Uzbekistan internationally.

Career
He made his Russian Football National League debut for FC Zhemchuzhina-Sochi on 10 August 2010 in a game against FC Shinnik Yaroslavl. He played 3 seasons in the FNL for Zhemchuzhina and Shinnik.

In February 2015 he signed a contract with Kokand 1912.

International career
ON 6 March 2020, Golban was naturalized as a Uzbekistani citizen after spending 5 years in the country. He debuted for the Uzbekistan national football team in a friendly 2-1 loss to Iran on 8 October 2020.

Honours

Club
Sigma Olomouc
 Czech Republic Supercup: 2012

References

External links

1990 births
Living people
Sportspeople from Sochi
Russian emigrants to Uzbekistan

Uzbekistani footballers
Uzbekistan international footballers
Russian footballers
Russia youth international footballers
Russia under-21 international footballers
Association football defenders
FC Zhemchuzhina Sochi players
FC Lokomotiv Moscow players
SK Sigma Olomouc players
FC Shinnik Yaroslavl players
FC Khimki players
Navbahor Namangan players
FC Nasaf players
Czech First League players
Russian expatriate footballers
Russian expatriate sportspeople in the Czech Republic
Expatriate footballers in the Czech Republic
Uzbekistan Super League players